James Arthur Presley (born October 23, 1961) is a former Major League Baseball infielder with an eight-year career from 1984 to 1991.  He played for the Seattle Mariners of the American League and the Atlanta Braves and San Diego Padres of the National League.  He was primarily a third baseman but also saw some time playing first base.  His nickname was "Hound Dog".

As a youth, he played baseball through the Dixie Youth association, first at Pensacola Brent then later Pensacola Myrtle Grove.  He graduated from Escambia High School in 1978.

While playing for Seattle in 1986, Presley became only the second batter in Major League history to hit two walk-off grand slams in the same season, joining Cy Williams, who had done so in 1926. Also in 1986, Presley was named to the American League All-Star team after hitting .265 with 27 home runs and a career high 107 RBIs. Injuries began to derail his career a couple of years later, and by 1992 he had segued from playing to coaching.

On December 21, 2005, he was signed to be the hitting coach for the Florida Marlins. He was fired along with manager Fredi González and bench coach Carlos Tosca on June 23, 2010. He was replaced on an interim basis by John Mallee, who was the Marlins minor league hitting coordinator.

On October 8, 2010, Presley was inducted into the Escambia High School Sports Hall of Fame during halftime of an EHS football game along with former Dallas Cowboys Hall of Fame running back Emmitt Smith and a few other EHS alumni.

Presley joined the Baltimore Orioles as their hitting coach for the 2011 season.

Pro career
The Seattle Mariners drafted Presley in the fourth round of the June MLB draft in 1979. Presley made his pro debut at the age of 17 for Seattle's Single A team, the Bellingham Mariners. Drafted as a shortstop, Presley converted to third base in the minor leagues. This improved his odds, as while Presley was having his struggles in the minors with his bat, Seattle in 1982 drafted Spike Owen in the first round of the 1982 draft, and fast-tracked him to the majors. While Presley showed power, hitting more than 20 homers many times, his batting average suffered. In 1984, as a member of the Triple-A Salt Lake City Gulls, Presley had one of his best seasons as a pro, batting .317 with 13 home runs. This earned him a summertime call-up to the majors, essentially to take over third base, which was being held down by veteran Larry Milbourne. Seattle had looked at Darnell Coles for the position, but he could never stay healthy long enough.  Along with shortstop Owen and power-hitting first baseman Alvin Davis, Seattle had the makings of a strong infield.

In 1985, the Mariners finished in last place, but Presley provided power with 28 home runs and a .275 batting average. In 1986, Presley was selected to the All-Star team, but he did not see any action sitting behind Wade Boggs and Brook Jacoby. In that same season, Presley made baseball history by becoming just the second player to hit two walk-off grand slams in the same season. Until then, the only player to have done so was Cy Williams. In 1987, both his power numbers (24 home runs, and batting average of .247) dipped. However, he did record a career-high 107 RBIs and led the American League in assists by a third baseman. In 1990, Seattle traded Presley to the Atlanta Braves in exchange for career minor league infielder Ken Pennington and pitcher Gary Eave. Presley was only in Atlanta for one season and signed with the San Diego Padres as a free agent in 1991. He only appeared in 20 games for San Diego and then was on the move again, signing with the Texas Rangers. Presley never played at the major league level for Texas, instead playing for their Triple-A farm club, the Oklahoma City 89ers.

While playing for Seattle, Presley set the team record for most home runs hit by a third baseman which has since been broken by Kyle Seager. Presley's play during his time in Seattle led to the team converting prospect third baseman Edgar Martinez into a designated hitter; Martinez went on to enjoy a hall-of-fame career.

Managing and coaching career
Presley got his first chance to be a manager in 2004 when he was named to manage the Missoula Osprey of the Pioneer League. He only managed the team for two seasons, compiling a 61-88 record. Presely has served as a hitting coach for the Arizona Diamondbacks from 1998-2000, Florida Marlins from 2006-2010, The Baltimore Orioles from 2011-2014 and the Texas Rangers from 2016-2017. In 2018, the Chinatrust Brothers of the CPBL named Presley as their hitting coach.

References

External links

1961 births
Living people
Baseball players from Pensacola, Florida
American League All-Stars
Seattle Mariners players
Major League Baseball third basemen
Atlanta Braves players
San Diego Padres players
Bellingham Mariners players
Lynn Sailors players
Wausau Timbers players
Chattanooga Lookouts players
Salt Lake City Gulls players
Oklahoma City 89ers players
Major League Baseball hitting coaches
Arizona Diamondbacks coaches
Florida Marlins coaches
Atlanta Braves coaches
Sportspeople from Pensacola, Florida
CTBC Brothers coaches